Alejandro José "Álex" Muñoz Miquel (born 30 July 1994) is a Spanish professional footballer who plays for Levante UD mainly as a central defender but also as a left-back.

Club career
Born in Sant Joan d'Alacant, Alicante, Valencian Community, Muñoz played youth football with local club Alicante CF from ages 9 to 15, and finished his development at neighbouring Hércules CF. In 2012, he was crowned under-18 champion with the Valencian Community autonomous team and, on 22 September of that year, while still a junior, he made his debut as a professional, coming on as a 73rd-minute substitute for Pepe Mora in a 0–3 Segunda División home loss against FC Barcelona B.

On 18 September 2013, Muñoz signed a new three-year contract, and was assigned to FC Jove Español San Vicente, the farm team in the Tercera División. On 19 August 2014 he agreed to an extension until 2018, being definitely promoted to the main squad now in the Segunda División B.

On 21 July 2016, Muñoz joined Sevilla FC on a three-year deal, but only represented their reserves. He scored his first goal in the second division on 19 August 2017, closing the 1–1 away draw with CA Osasuna.

Muñoz moved to second-tier Real Zaragoza in July 2018, also for three seasons. He terminated his contract after only one, however, and signed for CD Tenerife in the same league. 

On 8 July 2022, Muñoz agreed to a two-year contract with Levante UD also in division two.

References

External links

1994 births
Living people
Spanish footballers
Footballers from Alicante
Association football defenders
Segunda División players
Segunda División B players
Tercera División players
Divisiones Regionales de Fútbol players
Hércules CF B players
Hércules CF players
Sevilla Atlético players
Real Zaragoza players
CD Tenerife players
Levante UD footballers